Jinggangshan is a county-level city in the southwest of Jiangxi province, People's Republic of China, bordering Hunan province to the west. It is under the administration of the Ji'an City.

Administrative divisions
In the present, Jinggangshan City has one subdistrict, five towns, and 12 townships.
1 subdistrict
 Ciping

5 towns

12 townships

Transport 
Jinggangshan Airport in Taihe County, Ji'an serves Jinggangshan.

Climate

See also

 Jinggang Mountains

References

External links 
 
 Further reading

 
Administrative subdivisions of Jiangxi
Cities in Jiangxi